Highlights: The Very Best of Yes is the fourth compilation album by English progressive rock band Yes, released in September 1993 on Atlantic Records. It contains 12 tracks that span most of the group's history, from their debut album Yes (1969) to Big Generator (1987). The set reached gold certification by the Recording Industry Association of America for selling 500,000 copies in the US.

Track listing

Personnel
Jon Anderson – lead vocals on all tracks
Chris Squire – bass and backing vocals on all tracks
Peter Banks – guitars on 1–2
Steve Howe – guitars and backing vocals on 3–9
Trevor Rabin – guitars, lead and backing vocals on 10–12
Tony Kaye – keyboards on 1–4, 10–12
Rick Wakeman – keyboards on 5–6, 8–9
Patrick Moraz – keyboards on 7
Bill Bruford – drums and percussion on 1–6
Alan White – drums and percussion on 7–12

Certifications

References

1993 greatest hits albums
Yes (band) compilation albums
Atlantic Records compilation albums